Waldemar Kosiński (born 17 March 1965) is a Polish weightlifter. He competed in the men's middleweight event at the 1988 Summer Olympics.

References

1965 births
Living people
Polish male weightlifters
Olympic weightlifters of Poland
Weightlifters at the 1988 Summer Olympics
People from Masovian Voivodeship
World Weightlifting Championships medalists
20th-century Polish people
21st-century Polish people